The Irish calendar is the Gregorian calendar as it is in use in Ireland, but also incorporating Irish cultural festivals and views of the division of the seasons, presumably inherited from earlier Celtic calendar traditions.

For example, the pre-Christian Celtic year began on 1 November, although in common with the rest of the Western world, the year now begins on 1 January.

Winter ("Geimhreadh") - November, December, January (Samhain, Nollaig, Eanáir)
Spring ("Earrach") - February, March, April (Imbolc, then Feabhra, Márta, Aibreán)
Summer ("Samhradh") - May, June, July (Bealtaine, Meitheamh, Iúil)
Autumn ("Fómhar" Harvest) - August, September, October (Lúnasa, Meán Fómhair, Deireadh Fómhair)

In English-language Julian calendars and its derivatives, the months are based on names from Classical mythology, such as the name "February" which derives from the Roman purification rite, Februa. In the Irish calendar, the names of the months in the Irish language refer to  Celtic religion and mythology, and generally predate the arrival of Christianity.  The words for May (Bealtaine), August (Lúnasa) and November (Samhain), are the names of Gaelic religious festivals. In addition, the names for September (Meán Fómhair) and October (Deireadh Fómhair) translate directly as "middle of harvest" and "end of harvest".  Christianity has also left its mark on the Irish months: the name for December (Nollaig) derives from Latin natalicia (birthday), referring to the birth of Christ.

Historical texts suggest that, during Ireland's Gaelic era, the day began and ended at sunset. Through contact with the Romans, the seven-day week was borrowed by continental Celts, and then spread to the people of Ireland. In Irish, four days of the week have names derived from Latin, while the other three relate to the fasting done by early Gaelic Christians.

 Dé Luain - from Latin dies Lunae
 Dé Máirt - from Latin dies Martis
 Dé Céadaoin - referring to Gaelic fasting: from céad (first) aoin (fast) i.e. the first fast of the week
 Déardaoin - the day between the fasts
 Dé hAoine - the day of the fast
 Dé Sathairn - from Latin dies Saturni
 Dé Domhnaigh - from Latin dies Dominicus (an alternative Latin name for Sunday, dies Solis being more common)

See also
 Calendar of saints
 Celtic calendar
 Coligny calendar
 Gregorian calendar
 Liturgical year
 The Old Cows Days/The Days of the Brindled Cow

References

Specific calendars
Calendar
Calendar
Calendar
Calendar
Manx culture
Calendar